The 2019 Diamond League was the tenth season of the annual series of outdoor track and field meetings, organised by the International Association of Athletics Federations (IAAF). It featured fourteen meetings, with the final two meetings serving as the series finals. It is the third edition to feature the new championship-style system.

Schedule
The following fourteen meetings are scheduled to be included in the 2019 season:

Calendar

Season overview
 Events held at Diamond League meets, but not included in the Diamond League points race, are marked in grey background.
 Diamond league final winners are marked with light blue background.

Men

Track

Field

Women

Track

Field

References

External links

Official website

 
Diamond League
Diamond League